Litchfield Beach, also known simply as Litchfield,  is an unincorporated community and census-designated place (CDP) in South Carolina, United States. It was first listed as a CDP in the 2020 census with a population of 8,370.

It lies three miles north of Pawleys Island, on the South Carolina Grand Strand. The communities Litchfield-By-The-Sea and North Litchfield are within Litchfield Beach.

The community takes its name from Litchfield Plantation, a rice plantation founded early in the 18th century. It initially started in the 1950s as Retreat Beach. Modern development of the community began in the 1960s.

Demographics

2020 census

Note: the US Census treats Hispanic/Latino as an ethnic category. This table excludes Latinos from the racial categories and assigns them to a separate category. Hispanics/Latinos can be of any race.

References 

 

Georgetown County, South Carolina
Unincorporated communities in South Carolina
Unincorporated communities in Georgetown County, South Carolina
Census-designated places in South Carolina
Census-designated places in Georgetown County, South Carolina